Ján Oravec CSc. (born 6 June 1964, in Senica) is a Slovak economist and current secretary of state of Ministry of Finance of the Slovak Republic. He is the president of The Entrepreneurs Association of Slovakia. In 2004, he became a member of the European committee and in 2013 he became a member of its presidium.

Career  
2003 – present: president, The Entrepreneurs Association of Slovakia, the first organisation of private businesses in a modern history of Slovakia, after 1989,
2004 – present: a member of a Presidium of The National Union of Employers, the most representative organisation of employers in Slovakia,
2004 – present: a member of the European Economic and Social Committee in Brussels representing Slovak employers,
1999–2002: a Chief of Strategy at the Ministry of Economy of the Slovak Republic.
1992–2013: a founding father of The F. A. Hayek Foundation Bratislava (established in 1991), and The Slovak Taxpayers Association (1997), one of the most successful (in terms of their impact on economic policy) and the most respected NGOs in a Central and Eastern Europe.

About  
Oravec graduated in 1987 from Commenius University in Bratislava (Philosophy – Political Economy), The Swinburne University of Technology, Melbourne, Australia in 1994 (Business Administration) and Southern Methodist University, Dallas, Texas, US, in 1993–1995 (Bank Management). In 1996 he received his PhD degree in economics at theInstitute of Slovak and World Economy in Bratislava.
He started his professional career at the Institute of Economics of the Slovak Academy of Sciences in 1987. In the beginning of 90s he was active in financial sector (financial manager in investment fund, director of the Investment Banking Dept. in Devin Bank, internships in Banc One, Dallas, Texas, US, and Westpac Bank, Sydney, Australia).
In 1999–2002 Oravec was working as a chief of strategy at the Ministry of Economy of the Slovak Republic. During that period he served as a chairman and member of various supervisory boards (SSE, a.s., – one three regional electricity distribution companies, The Slovak Guarantee and Development Bank, Transpetrol, a.s., Slovak Consolidation Agency, Slovak Post-Privatisation Fund), a chairman of a board of directors (National Agency for SMEs) and a vice-chairman of the Government Council for Science and Technology.
In October 2003 he was elected as a president of The Entrepreneurs Association of Slovakia, the first organisation of private entrepreneurs in Slovakia after a collapse of communism. He is a member of a Presidium of The National Union of Employers, the most representative organisation of employers in Slovakia. Since 2004 he represents Slovak employers in the European Economic and Social Committee in Brussels.

Since 2004 he is a member of a scientific board of a Faculty of Economics and Public Administration, The University of Economics in Prague, and a member of an industrial board of The Slovak University of Technology in Bratislava. He is a founding father of The F. A. Hayek Foundation Bratislava (established in 1991), and The Slovak Taxpayers Association (1997), since 2004 he is also a member of an academic board of a Liberal Institute in Prague.

He has his own business in consulting, focusing on regulatory impact assessments, sectoral analysis, macroeconomic analysis, economic outlooks, etc. He writes articles, gives lectures, TV interviews, and public speeches on various topics. He lives in Bratislava. He is married and has two children.

References

External sources
Reference from Latvia journal
Jan Oravec about entrepreneurs in Slovakia
Interview with Jan Oravec

1964 births
Living people
Slovak economists
Comenius University alumni
Slovak University of Technology in Bratislava
People from Senica